Sir Paul Maxime Nurse  (born 25 January 1949) is an English geneticist, former President of the Royal Society and Chief Executive and Director of the Francis Crick Institute. He was awarded the 2001 Nobel Prize in Physiology or Medicine along with Leland Hartwell and Tim Hunt for their discoveries of protein molecules that control the division of cells in the cell cycle.

Early life and education
Nurse's mother went from London to Norwich, Norfolk and lived with relatives while awaiting Paul's birth (at the age of 18) in order to hide illegitimacy. For the rest of their lives, his maternal grandmother pretended to be his mother, and his mother pretended to be his sister.

Paul was brought up by his grandparents (whom he took to be his parents) in North West London. He was educated at Lyon Park school in Alperton and Harrow County Grammar School. He received his BSc degree in biology in 1970 from the University of Birmingham and his PhD degree in 1973 from the University of East Anglia for research on Candida utilis. He then pursued postdoctoral work at the University of Bern, the University of Edinburgh and the University of Sussex.

Nurse did not know that his "sister" was in fact his mother until he was in his 50s: his application for a green card for US residency while president of Rockefeller University was, to his surprise, rejected, despite his being a Nobel Prize winner, president of a university and a knight; this was because he had submitted a short-form UK birth certificate which did not name his parents. When he applied for a full birth certificate he discovered the truth, to his astonishment.

Career and research
Nurse continued his postdoctoral research at the laboratory of Murdoch Mitchison at the University of Edinburgh for the next six years (1973–1979).

Beginning in 1976, Nurse identified the gene cdc2 in fission yeast (Schizosaccharomyces pombe). This gene controls the progression of the cell cycle from G1 phase to S phase and the transition from G2 phase to mitosis. In 1987, Nurse identified the homologous gene in human, Cdk1, which codes for a cyclin dependent kinase.

Working in fission yeast, Nurse identified the gene cdc2, which controls the transition from G1 to S, when the cell grows in preparation for the duplication of DNA, and G2 to M, when the cell divides. With his postdoc Melanie Lee, Nurse also found the corresponding gene, CDK1, in humans. These genes stop and start cyclin dependent kinase (CDK) by adding or removing phosphate groups.

In 1984, Nurse joined the Imperial Cancer Research Fund (ICRF, now Cancer Research UK). He left in 1988 to chair the department of microbiology at the University of Oxford. He then returned to the ICRF as Director of Research in 1993, and in 1996 was named Director General of the ICRF, which became Cancer Research UK in 2002. In 2003, he became president of Rockefeller University in New York City where he continued work on the cell cycle of fission yeast.  In 2011 Nurse became the first Director and Chief Executive of the UK Centre for Medical Research and Innovation, now the Francis Crick Institute.

On 30 November 2010, Nurse succeeded astrophysicist Martin Rees for a five-year term as President of the Royal Society until 2015.

Nurse has said good scientists must have passion "to know the answer to the questions" that interest them, along with good technical ability, and a set of attitudes including mental honesty, self-criticism, open-mindedness and scepticism.

Awards and honours
In addition to the Nobel Prize, Nurse has received numerous awards and honours. He was elected an EMBO Member in 1987 and a Fellow of the Royal Society (FRS) in 1989 and the Founder Member of the Academy of Medical Sciences in 1998.  In 1995, he was awarded the Pezcoller-AACR International Award. he received a Royal Medal and became a foreign associate of the U.S. National Academy of Sciences. He received the Albert Lasker Award for Basic Medical Research in 1998. Nurse was knighted in 1999. He was awarded the French Legion d'Honneur and the Golden Plate Award of the American Academy of Achievement in 2002. He was also awarded the Copley Medal in 2005. He was elected a Foreign Honorary Member of the American Academy of Arts and Sciences – one of the top honours – in April 2006. He is a member of the Advisory Council for the Campaign for Science and Engineering. Nurse is the 2007 recipient of the Hope Funds Award of Excellence in Basic Research. He is a Freeman of the London Borough of Harrow. In 2013, he was awarded the Albert Einstein World Award of Science by the World Cultural Council. In 2015, he was elected a foreign academician of the Chinese Academy of Sciences, and won the 10th annual Henry G. Friesen International Prize in Health Research, in Ottawa, Canada. He was appointed Member of the Order of the Companions of Honour (CH) in the 2022 New Year Honours for services to science and medicine in the UK and abroad. In November 2022 he was appointed to the Order of Merit.

Nurse has received over 60 Honorary Degrees and Fellowships, including from the University of Bath in 2002, the University of Oxford in 2003, the University of Cambridge in 2003, the University of Kent in 2012, the University of Warwick (Doctor of Science) the University of Worcester (Doctor of Science) in 2013, City, University of London (Doctor of Science) in 2014 and McGill University (Doctor of Science) in 2017. In 2020 he was awarded an honorary degree from the Mendel University Brno in the Czech Republic.

He was also appointed an Honorary Fellow of the Royal Academy of Engineering (HonFREng) in 2012 and Honorary Fellow of the British Association (HonFBA) in 2013. In July 2016 it was announced that he will be the next Chancellor of the University of Bristol. He is an Honorary Liveryman of the Worshipful Company of Scientific Instrument Makers.

Personal life
Nurse married Anne Teresa (née Talbott) in 1971; they have two daughters – Sarah, who works for ITV, and Emily, a physicist based at University College London and CERN. He describes himself as a sceptical agnostic.

Political views 
Nurse has been a member of the Labour Party (UK) for nearly 40 years and is a patron of Scientists for Labour, a Socialist Society affiliated to the Labour Party. In September 2020, he was a co-author on a letter in Nature alongside former Prime Minister Gordon Brown highlighting the importance of EU funding in the fight against COVID-19.

As an undergraduate student at Birmingham, Nurse sold Socialist Worker, and participated in an occupation of the vice-chancellor's office. As a graduate student at East Anglia he continued to sell Socialist Worker, and was sympathetic to the International Socialist Tendency but never formally joined the movement.

Nurse has criticized potential Republican Party candidates for the US presidential nomination for opposing the teaching of natural selection, stem cell research on cell lines from human embryos, and anthropogenic climate change, even partially blaming scientists for not speaking up. He was alarmed that this could happen in the U.S., a world leader in science, "the home of Benjamin Franklin, Richard Feynman and Jim Watson."

One problem, Nurse said, was "treating scientific discussion as if it were political debate," using rhetorical tricks rather than logic. Another was the state of science teaching in the schools, which does not teach citizens how to discuss science – particularly in religious schools, even in the United Kingdom. Nurse has written that "we need to emphasise why the scientific process is such a reliable generator of knowledge with its respect for evidence, for scepticism, for consistency of approach, for the constant testing of ideas." Furthermore, Nurse feels that scientific leaders "have a responsibility to expose the bunkum". They should take on politicians, and expose nonsense during elections.

In August 2014, Nurse was one of 200 public figures who were signatories to a letter to The Guardian expressing their hope that Scotland would vote to remain part of the United Kingdom in September's referendum on that issue.

Nurse believes that scientists should speak out about science in public affairs and challenge politicians who support policies based on pseudoscience.

Books 

 What Is Life?: Five Great Ideas in Biology (2021), W. W. Norton & Company

See also
 List of presidents of the Royal Society

References

External links

  including the Nobel Lecture Nobel Lecture 9 December 2001 Controlling the Cell Cycle
 Stories told by Paul Nurse at The Moth
 Paul Nurse on the premiere episode of The Life Scientific (BBC Radio 4), originally aired: 11 Oct 2011, 30 minutes in length

 

1949 births
Living people
Academics of the Francis Crick Institute
Academics of the University of Edinburgh
Academics of the University of Oxford
Albert Einstein World Award of Science Laureates
Alumni of the University of Birmingham
Alumni of the University of East Anglia
British biochemists
British geneticists
British Nobel laureates
Cell biologists
English agnostics
English Nobel laureates
Fellows of Churchill College, Cambridge
Fellows of the Royal Society
Foreign associates of the National Academy of Sciences
Foreign members of the Chinese Academy of Sciences
Knights Bachelor
Members of the European Molecular Biology Organization
Members of the Order of Merit
Members of the Order of the Companions of Honour
Nobel laureates in Physiology or Medicine
People educated at Harrow High School
Scientists from Norwich
Presidents of Rockefeller University
Presidents of the Royal Society
Recipients of the Albert Lasker Award for Basic Medical Research
Recipients of the Copley Medal
Royal Medal winners
Winners of the Heineken Prize
Honorary Fellows of the British Academy
Fellows of the Academy of Medical Sciences (United Kingdom)